Event Two of the 2017 Monster Energy FIM Speedway World Cup was the second race of the 2017 edition of the Speedway World Cup. It was staged on July 4 at the Stena Arena in Västervik, Sweden and was won by Sweden from Russia, Latvia, and Denmark. As a result, Sweden progressed directly to the 2017 Speedway World Cup Final, while Russia and Latvia progressed to the 2017 Speedway World Cup Race-off. Denmark were eliminated.

Latvia and Denmark initially tied on 28 points after the 20 qualifying heats, however Andžejs Ļebedevs beat Niels-Kristian Iversen in a run-off to secure the Latvians place in the race-off. It was the first time since the Speedway World Cup was introduced in 2001 that Denmark had been eliminated at this stage.

Antonio Lindbäck and Fredrik Lindgren top scored for Sweden with 11 and 10 points respectively, while Grigory Laguta led Russia with a 12-point haul.

Results

Scores

References

See also 
 2017 Speedway Grand Prix

2017 Speedway World Cup